The  or  is a multi-site pilgrimage of 88 temples associated with the Buddhist monk Kūkai (Kōbō Daishi) on the island of Shikoku, Japan. The pilgrimage is traditionally completed on foot, but modern pilgrims use cars, taxis, buses, bicycles, or motorcycles, and often augment their travels with public transportation.

In addition to the 88 "official" temples of the pilgrimage, there are 20 bekkaku (別格) temples, which are officially associated with the Shikoku Pilgrimage (and hundreds more bangai (番外) temples, simply meaning "outside the numbers," which are not considered part of the official 88). To complete the pilgrimage, it is not necessary to visit the temples in order; in some cases, pilgrims complete the journey in reverse, a practice known as gyaku-uchi (逆うち).

They are often recognizable by their white clothing, sedge hats, and kongō-zue or walking sticks. Alms or osettai (お接待) are frequently given to pilgrims by Shikoku's residents. 

Before reaching Temple 88, walking and bicycle pilgrims can receive a "Shikoku 88 Temple Pilgrimage Henro Ambassador" certificate from the Maeyama Ohenro Koryu Salon. At Temple 88, one can purchase a pilgrimage completion certificate called a kechi-gan-shō (結願証), meaning "fulfillment of one's wishes." Many pilgrims also begin and complete the journey by visiting Mount Kōya in Wakayama Prefecture, which was settled by Kūkai and remains the headquarters of Shingon Buddhism. The  walking trail up to Kōya-san still exists, but most pilgrims use the train.

History

Background
Pilgrimages have played an important part in Japanese religious practice since at least the Heian period. Typically centred upon holy mountains, particular divinities, or charismatic individuals, they are usually to Buddhist sites although those to the shrines of Kumano and Ise are notable exceptions.

Kōbō Daishi
Kūkai, born at Zentsū-ji (Temple 75) in 774, studied in China, and upon his return was influential in the promotion of esoteric Buddhism. He established the Shingon retreat on Kōya-san, was an active writer, undertook a programme of public works, and during visits to the island of his birth is popularly said to have established or visited many of its temples and to have carved many of their images. He is posthumously known as Kōbō Daishi.

Development
The legends and cult of Kōbō Daishi, such as the episode of Emon Saburō, were maintained and developed by the monks of Kōya-san who travelled to expound Shingon and were active, along with other hijiri, in Shikoku. In the Edo period, the policy of  restricted and regulated the movement of ordinary people. Pilgrims were required to obtain travel permits, follow the main paths, and pass through localities within a certain time limit, with the book of temple stamps or nōkyō-chō helping to provide proof of passage.

Practice

Stages
Shikoku literally means "four provinces", those of Awa, Tosa, Iyo, and Sanuki, reorganized during the Meiji period into the prefectures of Tokushima, Kōchi, Ehime, and Kagawa.

Equipment

Rites
Upon arrival at each temple the henro washes before proceeding to the Hondō. Coins and a fuda are similarly offered, and again the Heart Sutra is chanted, along with repetition of the Gohōgō Mantra, namu-Daishi-henjō-kongō.

UNESCO World Heritage Bid
Since 2010, Shikoku's prefectural governments, NPO members, and local leaders have worked toward achieving UNESCO World Heritage status for the Shikoku Pilgrimage. Currently, it is recognized as a "Provisional Candidate" by Japan's Agency for Cultural Affairs, or a cultural asset which has not yet been added to Japan's World Heritage Tentative List but which should 'proceed with preparations.'

Imitative versions
Attesting to the popularity of the Shikoku pilgrimage, from the eighteenth century a number of smaller imitative versions have been established. These include a  circuit on Shōdo Island northeast of Takamatsu; a  course on the grounds of Ninna-ji in Kyoto; a route on the Chita Peninsula near Nagoya; and circuits in Edo and Chiba Prefecture. Outside Japan, another version is on the Hawai'ian island of Kaua'i.

List of Main 88 Temples

List of 20 Bekkaku Temples

See also
 Shingon
 Kōyasan
 Japan 100 Kannon, pilgrimage composed of the Saigoku, Bandō and Chichibu pilgrimages.
 Saigoku 33 Kannon, pilgrimage in the Kansai region. 
 Bandō 33 Kannon, pilgrimage in the Kantō region.
 Chichibu 34 Kannon, pilgrimage in Saitama Prefecture.
 Musashino Kannon Pilgrimage, pilgrimage in Tokyo and Saitama prefectures.
 Chūgoku 33 Kannon, pilgrimage in the Chūgoku region.
 Kannon
 Buddhism in Japan
 Tourism in Japan
 For an explanation of terms concerning Japanese Buddhism, Japanese Buddhist art, and Japanese Buddhist temple architecture, see the Glossary of Japanese Buddhism.

References

Further reading

External links

 About Shikoku Pilgrimage
 A Basic Guide to the Shikoku Pilgrimage (Japan National Tourism Organization)
 The Shikoku Henro World Heritage Inscription Council Office
 Documentary movie about the 88 Temple Pilgrimage

Shikoku region
Buddhist pilgrimages
Shingon Buddhism
Religious buildings and structures in Ehime Prefecture
Religious buildings and structures in Kagawa Prefecture
Religious buildings and structures in Kōchi Prefecture
Religious buildings and structures in Tokushima Prefecture
Japanese pilgrimages